The Luzhou railway station is a high-speed railway station of the Mianyang–Luzhou high-speed railway. The station is located in  Luzhou, Sichuan province.

References 

Railway stations in Sichuan
Railway stations in China opened in 2021